Jal Shah  is a Nepalese-American actress. Jal Shah is one of the most well known, influential  and renowned Nepali actresses of all time. She is highly regarded for her extreme talent, and large number of blockbuster movies. Jal Shah is also very well known for her iconic expressions, and her extreme range and versatility when it comes to her roles.

Early life 
Jal Shah was born on December 13th, 1982 in Patan Hospital, Patan Kathmandu, to Prema Giri Rajya Laxmi Shah, a renowned author and social activist. Jal Shah is related to the royal family through her mother. Shah's father was not present in her childhood, she spent her time in both Birgunj and Kathmandu.

First Movies 
Jal Shah’s first movie was a small role in the religious movie “Shreeswasthani” at age 13. Her first lead was in “Avatar” (not to be confused with the 2009 Fantasy Film) where Jal Shah played Priyanka, a sassy young woman, with renowned Rajesh Hamal as her opposite. The film was a huge box office success, with critics raving about Shah’s immense talent at a young age. It has been said that she’s won everybody (The Nepali public) over with her first performance.

Achievements 
Jal shah is the recipient of  multiple awards for her phenomenal acting. Including the extremely prestigious Order of Gorkha Dakshina Bahu “…as an order of knighthood of Nepal. It was one of the highest honors given traditionally by the king” for her outstanding contribution to the industry. Jal Shah was also chosen by North Korean government officials to attend the 2006  Pyongyang Flim Festival.

Current Life 
After filming Krodh (2006) Jal Shah moved to the United States of America, where she married her husband. Jal Shah currently lives with her daughter and husband. Although she is no longer on the screen. Shah is still active in her line of work, through different aspects. currently she is the US citizen.

Filmography

References

External links

Living people
20th-century Nepalese actresses
21st-century Nepalese actresses
 1982 births
Actors from Kathmandu
Nepalese film actresses
Actresses in Nepali cinema